An endothelin receptor antagonist (ERA) is a drug that blocks endothelin receptors.

Three main kinds of ERAs exist: 
 selective ETA receptor antagonists (sitaxentan, ambrisentan, atrasentan, BQ-123, zibotentan, edonentan), which affect endothelin A receptors.
 dual antagonists (bosentan, macitentan, tezosentan), which affect both endothelin A and B receptors.
 selective ETB receptor antagonists (BQ-788 and A192621) which affect  endothelin B receptors are used in research but have not yet reached the clinical trial stage.

Sitaxentan, ambrisentan and bosentan are mainly used for the treatment of pulmonary arterial hypertension, while atrasentan is an experimental anti-cancer drug.

References